Within physics, the Hybrid Theory for photon transport in tissue uses the advantages and eliminates the deficiencies of both the Monte Carlo method and the diffusion theory for photon transport to model photons traveling through tissue both accurately and efficiently.

MCML (Monte Carlo Modeling of Light Transportation in Multi-Layered Medium) 
The MCML is a numerical way to simulate photon transport in biological tissue. Each photon packet follows a random walk with persistence, where the direction of each step dependent on the direction of the previous step. By averaging multiple independent random walks, MCML estimates the ensemble-averaged quantities such as reflectance, transmittance, absorption, and fluence.

Briefly, a packet of photon is first launched into the biological tissue. The parameters of photon transport, including the step size and deflection angle due to scattering, are determined by random sampling from probability distributions. A fraction of weight, determined by the scattering and absorption coefficients is deposited at the interaction site. The photon packet continues propagating until the weight left is smaller than a certain threshold. If this packet of photon hits the boundary during the propagation, it is either reflected or transmitted, determined by a pseudorandom number. Statistically sufficient numbers of photon packets must be simulated to obtain the expected values accurately.

Advantages and Disadvantages

This Monte Carlo method is rigorous and flexible. However, because of its statistical nature, this method requires tracking a large number of photon packets, making it computationally expensive.

Diffusion Theory 
The Diffusion Theory is an approximation of the radiative transfer equation (RTE), and an analytical way to simulate photon transport. As such, it has the ability to model photon propagation through tissue quickly.

As an example, one way to attain a solution for a pencil beam that is vertically incident on a semi-infinite homogeneous scattering medium is by taking three approximation steps as follows:
 The anisotropically scattering medium is converted to an isotropically scattering medium. The anisotropy  is then set to zero;
 The unit-power pencil beam is converted into an equivalent isotropic point source at a depth that is equal to the transport mean free path, with a power equal to the transport albedo;
 The boundary effect of the scattering medium is removed by adding an image source to satisfy the boundary condition.
Advantages and Disadvantages

Diffusion Theory is more computationally efficient than MCML. However, it is also less accurate than MCML near the source and boundaries.

Hybrid Theory 
The Hybrid Theory combines the Diffusion Theory and the Monte Carlo method in order to increase accuracy near the source and boundaries while reducing computation time. In the previous example for the Diffusion Theory, a semi-infinite scattering medium with only one boundary was assumed. If the geometry is a slab, the second boundary must be taken into account. The fluence rate at the extrapolated boundaries must be approximately 0. Using an array of image sources fulfills this boundary condition. The extrapolated boundary is located at distance . Only 2-3 pairs are usually necessary to achieve good accuracy.

A Monte Carlo approach can be used to make up for the Diffusion Theory's inherently poor accuracy near the boundaries. As mentioned before, the Monte Carlo simulation is time consuming. When a photon packet is within a critical depth  the Monte Carlo simulation tracks all packets but within the center region the photon packet is transformed to an isotropic source and subsequently treated with Diffusion Theory. Just like in the Monte Carlo simulation, any photon packet that gets reemitted is added to the diffuse reflectance .

When a photon packet is scattered into the center zone , it is conditionally converted to an isotropic point source. The photon packet must still be in the center region after one transport mean free path  along the direction of the photon packet propagation for it to be converted to a point source, otherwise the Monte Carlo simulation continues. Before the conversion to an isotropic point source, the photon packet reduces its weight due to its interaction with the scattering medium. The resulting weight is recorded as a source function . This is the accumulated weight distribution which can be converted to relative source density function  by:

The additional diffuse reflectance  from the sources is calculated as:

The total diffuse reflectance would be  and  added together.

Advantages over Diffusion Theory and MCML 
A trade-off between simulation speed and accuracy exists; choosing a critical depth  becomes the deciding factor for simulation speed with a deeper critical depth resulting in slower times due to packets needing to be tracked for a longer distance before the transition to diffusion theory.

Advantages
 More accurate than the Diffusion Theory, especially near the source
 Faster than the Monte Carlo method

Comparisons Between Theories

References 

Scientific simulation software
Optical software